Ernest Mangu is the Inspector General of Police of Tanzania. Before his appointment Mangu served as the Director of Criminal Intelligence in the Police Force.

Early life and education
Mangu was born in 1959 and raised at Ikhanuda village in Singida Region of central Tanzania to a Nyatutu family.

He joined the Moshi Police Academy on 17 August 1982 for basic police training and completed in June 1983. In 1987, he joined the University of Dar es Salaam pursuing law at a certificate level. Later, he was admitted for a bachelor's degree programme and graduated in November 1992 and conferred with LLB. In June 2010, Mangu was awarded master's degree in Security Affairs by National Defense University after completing his studies.

References

Living people
Tanzanian police officers
1959 births